Bosmina is a genus in the order Cladocera, the water fleas. Its members can be distinguished from those of Bosminopsis (the only other genus in the family Bosminidae) by the separation of the antennae; in Bosminopsis, the antennae are fused at their bases.

Bosmina are filter feeders consuming algae and protozoans about 1–3 μm long. Bosmina are known to have a dual feeding mechanism. They can filter the water using their second and third legs and the first leg will grab the particles. The second and third legs have small setules attached to the seta to make a mesh-like structure for filtering.

Some Bosmina species are non-native species, many of which pose a great threat to aquatic ecosystems.

Species list

Bosmina affinis
Bosmina arctica
Bosmina berolinensis
Bosmina bohemica
Bosmina brevirostris
Bosmina cederstroemi
Bosmina chilensis
Bosmina coregoni
Bosmina crassicornis
Bosmina curvirostris
Bosmina diaphana
Bosmina fatalis
Bosmina freyi
Bosmina gibbera
Bosmina globosa
Bosmina hagmanni
Bosmina humilis
Bosmina insignis
Bosmina lacustris
Bosmina liederi
Bosmina lilljeborgi
Bosmina lilljeborgii
Bosmina longicornis
Bosmina longirostris
Bosmina meridionalis
Bosmina microps
Bosmina mixta
Bosmina obtusirostris
Bosmina procumbens
Bosmina stuhlmanni
Bosmina thersites

References

Further reading

External links

Cladocera
Branchiopoda genera